Kurudere is a  village in Pınarhisar district of Kırklareli Province, Turkey,  It is situated in the eastern Trakya (Thrace) plains at . The population of the village is 485 as of 2011. In the 19th century most of the  population was composed of Ethnic Bulgarians. But after the Second Balkan War the Bulgarian population was forced to leave the settlement.

References

Villages in Pınarhisar District